Denis Karić (born 1 December 1972) is a Bosnian retired football player.

Club career
He played for Željezničar from 2001 until 2005.

International career
Karić made five appearances for Bosnia and Herzegovina at the June 2001 Merdeka Tournament: an unofficial match against Slovakia marked his international debut and an official international match against Uzbekistan was his final game.

Post-playing career
Karić was re-appointed sports director at Sloboda Tuzla in May 2018.

References

External links

Profile - NFSBIH

1972 births
Living people
Sportspeople from Tuzla
Association football defenders
Bosnia and Herzegovina footballers
Bosnia and Herzegovina international footballers
FK Sloboda Tuzla players
FK Željezničar Sarajevo players
NK Bratstvo Gračanica players
Premier League of Bosnia and Herzegovina players
First League of the Federation of Bosnia and Herzegovina players